Novak Djokovic was the defending champion, but was unable to participate due to a back injury.

Tomáš Berdych won the title, defeating Marin Čilić in the final, 3–6, 6–4, 6–1.

Seeds

Qualifying

Draw

Finals

Top half

Bottom half

References
 Main Draw

China Open - Men's Singles